Siphonoperla is a genus of stoneflies in the family Chloroperlidae.

Species
Species within this genus include:
Siphonoperla baetica (Aubert, 1956)
Siphonoperla burmeisteri (Pictet, 1841)
Siphonoperla graeca (Aubert, 1956)
Siphonoperla hajastanica (Zhiltzova, 1961)
Siphonoperla italica (Aubert, 1953)
Siphonoperla korab Graf, 2012
Siphonoperla lepineyi (Navás, 1935)
Siphonoperla libanica Alouf, 1992
Siphonoperla montana (Pictet, 1841)
Siphonoperla neglecta (Rostock, 1881)
Siphonoperla ottomoogi Graf, 2008
Siphonoperla taurica (Pictet, 1841)
Siphonoperla torrentium (Pictet, 1841)
Siphonoperla transsylvanica (Kis, 1963)

References

Chloroperlidae
Plecoptera genera